Soppo is the name of two villages, Great Soppo and Small Soppo in Buea, western Cameroon.

From 1904 to 1914 it was the headquarters of the German colonial military forces ("Schutztruppe").  Because of its moderate temperatures, owing to the altitude of the village (approximately 700 m), the Baptist missionary Carl Jacob Bender turned Great Soppo into a retreat for missionaries in the coastal regions of Cameroon.  The church he built in the 1930s still hovers above the village.

The current traditional ruler of Great Soppo is His Royal Highness Etina Monono.

Overview 
Great Soppo is a second class chiefdom in the Buea Municipality

Notable institutions 
Presbyterian Church

G.S.S Great Soppo

B.H.S Buea

References 

Populated places in Southwest Region (Cameroon)